Raipur Block Mahavidyalaya , established in 2010, is the general degree college in Kharigerya, Raipur, Bankura district. It offers undergraduate courses in arts. It is affiliated to Bankura University.

Departments

Arts

Bengali
English
History
Philosophy
Sanskrit
Santali
Political Science

Accreditation
The college is recognized by the University Grants Commission (UGC).

See also

References

External links 
Raipur Block Mahavidyalaya

Colleges affiliated to Bankura University
Universities and colleges in Bankura district
Educational institutions established in 2010
2010 establishments in West Bengal